The Sanel Valley in Mendocino County, California is a valley along the Russian River containing the town of Hopland.

The valley is served by U.S. Route 101, which passes through the valley near the west bank of the river, and by California State Route 175, which connects Hopland through the Mayacamas Mountains to Lakeport and Clear Lake to the east.

The name Sanel comes from a Pomo language word for a sweat lodge. A village of the Hopland Pomo was located at what is now Old Hopland and gave its name to the valley and the Rancho Sanel that encompassed it.

References

Valleys of Mendocino County, California
Valleys of California